The 2018 North Carolina Courage season is the team's second season as a professional women's soccer team. North Carolina Courage plays in the National Women's Soccer League, the top tier of women's soccer in the United States. On August 5, the Courage clinched the 2018 NWSL Shield for the second consecutive season after a 2–1 win over Portland. The Courage finished the 2018 regular season with only 1 loss and broke the record for most wins in a season (17), most points (57) and most goals (53).

On September 22, North Carolina defeated the Portland Thorns 3-0 to win the 2018 NWSL Championship and completed one of the most successful seasons for a professional women's soccer team in the United States.

Team

Coaching staff

 Source: North Carolina Courage

First-team roster

 Source: North Carolina Courage

Player transactions

2018 NWSL College Draft

 Source: National Women's Soccer League

In

Out

Competitions

National Women's Soccer League

Preseason

 Source: North Carolina Courage

Regular season

 Source: North Carolina Courage''

Postseason playoffs

League table

Results by round

International friendlies

As defending 2017 Shield winners and playoff finalists, the Courage were selected to participate in the inaugural Women's International Champions Cup. They defeated French side Paris Saint-Germain Women in the semi-final round and French side and defending UEFA Women's Champions League titleholders Lyon Women in the final at Miami Garden's Hard Rock Stadium to become the first ever champions of the event.

Statistics

Appearances

Goalscorers 

Last updated: September 22, 2018.
Source: Competitive matches

Honors and awards

NWSL Season Awards

 Most Valuable Player: Lynn Williams (finalist), McCall Zerboni (finalist)  
 Defender of the Year: Abby Dahlkemper (finalist), Abby Erceg (finalist) 
 Coach of the Year: Paul Riley (finalist)
 Best XI: Abby Dahlkemper, Abby Erceg, McCall Zerboni, Crystal Dunn
 Second XI: Merritt Mathias, Debinha, Lynn Williams

NWSL Championship Game Awards
 Most Valuable Player: Jessica McDonald

NWSL Team of the Month

NWSL Player of the Month

NWSL Player of the Week

NWSL Goal of the Week

NWSL Save of the Week

See also
 2018 National Women's Soccer League season
 2018 in American soccer

References

North Carolina Courage
North Carolina Courage
North Carolina Courage seasons
North Carolina Courage